Line 4 of the Nanning Metro is a rapid transit line in Nanning. The line opened on 23 November 2020. The line is 20.7 km long with 16 stations.

Opening timeline

Stations

References

04
Railway lines opened in 2020
2020 establishments in China